"In Your Arms" is a song by Norwegian hip hop duo Nico & Vinz (previously known as Envy), their third charting single after their debut 2011 hit "One Song" and the follow-up 2013 single "Am I Wrong". It was released as a digital download in Norway on 21 October 2013. The song has peaked at number 4 in Norway and number 12 in Denmark. It has also made the top 60 of the Swedish charts.

The song was initially credited to Envy and later changed to Nico & Vinz, as the name change to Nico & Vinz came when the single was still charting in the various Scandinavian charts. The cover was also re-designed to match with the new name of the duo.

Later releases of the single outside Scandinavian countries are known as a proper Nico & Vinz song.

Change of name and credits
Norway
In the Norwegian VG-lista charts, the song was credited to Envy.

Denmark
Upon the song's entry in the Danish Tracklisten charts, the single was credited to Envy. With the change in name of the duo from Envy to Nico & Vinz however, later showings of "In Your Arms" on the Danish charts were credited to Nico & Vinz and the single, from 17 and 24 January 2014. Starting for the week of 31 January 2014, the Swedish charts began crediting it to Nico & Vinz.

International releases
The song was released in Australia on 16 September 2014. Nico & Vinz performed "In Your Arms" live on The X Factor Australia on 6 October 2014.

Track listings

Charts

Certifications

References

2013 songs
Nico & Vinz songs
Songs written by William Wiik Larsen